The first Atlanta International Pop Festival was a rock festival held at the Atlanta International Raceway in Hampton, Georgia, twenty miles south of Atlanta, on the July Fourth (Friday) weekend, 1969, more than a month before Woodstock.  Crowd estimates ranged from the high tens of thousands to as high as 150,000.   With temperatures nearing a hundred degrees, local fire departments used fire hoses to create "sprinklers" for the crowd to play in and cool off. It was a peaceful, energetic, hot and loud festival with few (if any) problems other than heat related. Concession stands were woefully inadequate. Attendees frequently stood in line for an hour to get a soft drink.

History
The festival was organized by a seventeen-member promotional team that included Chris Cowing, Robin Conant and Alex Cooley.  Cooley was also one of the organizers of the Texas International Pop Festival a few weeks later on Labor Day weekend, as well as the second, and last, Atlanta International Pop Festival the following summer, and the Mar Y Sol Pop Festival in Puerto Rico from April 1 to 3, 1972.  The sound system for the 1969 Atlanta festival was supplied by Hanley Sound of Medford, Massachusetts, and the light show was provided by The Electric Collage of Atlanta, both of which would return for the second Atlanta Pop Festival. Although his name appeared on the promotional poster, Chuck Berry did not perform at the festival.

On the Monday following the festival, July 7, the festival promoters gave Atlanta's music fans a gift:  a free concert in Atlanta's Piedmont Park featuring Chicago Transit Authority, Delaney & Bonnie & Friends, and Spirit, all of whom had played at the festival, and Grateful Dead, who had not.  According to the Atlanta Journal and Constitution, the free event was the promoters' way of showing "their appreciation for the overwhelming success of the festival", although Alex Cooley has also described their motivation as simple hippie guilt at making a few-thousand-dollar profit. Piedmont Park had by then become the location of regular, free, and often impromptu rock concerts by mostly local Atlanta bands, and, beginning in mid-May 1969, by Macon's new Allman Brothers Band.

Lineup
Over twenty musical acts performed at the event:

 Blood, Sweat & Tears
 Booker T. & the M.G.'s
 The Butterfield Blues Band
 Canned Heat
 Chicago Transit Authority
 Joe Cocker
 Creedence Clearwater Revival
 The Dave Brubeck Trio w/ Gerry Mulligan
 Delaney and Bonnie and Friends
 Grand Funk Railroad
 Ian & Sylvia
 Tommy James and the Shondells
 Janis Joplin
 Al Kooper
 Led Zeppelin
 Pacific Gas & Electric
 Johnny Rivers
 Spirit
 The Staple Singers
 Sweetwater
 Ten Wheel Drive
 Johnny Winter

See also
List of music festivals
List of historic rock festivals

References

External links
The festival as chronicled by The Strip Project

1960s in Atlanta
1969 in Georgia (U.S. state)
July 1969 events in the United States
Folk festivals in the United States
Rock festivals in the United States
Hippie movement
1969 in American music
Music festivals established in 1969
Pop music festivals in the United States
1969 music festivals